Suresh Gundu Amonkar (c. 1935 – 8 December 2019) was an Indian educationist, writer, and a Chairman of Goa Board of Secondary and Higher Secondary Education. He served as the director of State Literacy Mission and Adult Education, as the Chief Commissioner of Goa State chapter of the Bharat Scouts and Guides and as the president of the Council of Boards of Secondary Education (COBSE). He translated several classics into Konkani language, including Dhammapada, Tirukkuṛaḷ, Bhagavad Gita, Gospel of John and Dnyaneshwari. He was a recipient of the Goa State Teacher's Award and the 2012 Jyanpithkar Ravindra Kelekar Award. The Government of India awarded him the fourth highest civilian honour of the Padma Shri, in 2009, for his contributions to Literature and Education.

See also 

 Konkani literature
 List of translators
 Tirukkural translations into Konkani

References

External links 
 

1935 births
2019 deaths
Recipients of the Padma Shri in literature & education
Scholars from Goa
20th-century Indian educational theorists
20th-century Indian translators
Tamil–Konkani translators
Translators of the Tirukkural into Konkani
Tirukkural translators
Konkani-language writers